Urga are a Swedish music group that have released several albums under the Swedish record label Silence Records. A notable aspect of the band's music is the use of an invented language  called 'Urganska'. They have also performed in Cirkus Cirkörs one of Scandinavia's leading performing circus companies.

Discography

Albums
Ur Kaos Föds Allting (1997)
Etanol (1998)
Urgasm (2000)

Singles
Loco

References

External links
Silence - Urga
Myspace - Urga

Swedish musical groups
Musical groups established in 1996